Vatuvei is a surname. Notable people with the surname include:

Luatangi Vatuvei (born 1977), Tongan-born Japanese rugby union footballer
Manu Vatuvei (born 1986), New Zealand rugby league footballer
Sione Vatuvei (born 1983), Tongan-born Japanese rugby union footballer

Tongan-language surnames